Ignacio Liporace (born 10 April 1992) is an Argentine professional footballer who plays as a left-back for Greek Super League 2 club Kalamata.

Career
Liporace had youth spells with Boca Juniors and Argentinos Juniors. In 2013, San Miguel became his first senior club, with the defender remaining for two further years and scoring one goal in eighty-four games as the club rose from Primera D Metropolitana to Primera C Metropolitana. After thirty-four matches in the 2015 campaign, Liporace departed San Miguel to join fellow fourth tier outfit Cañuelas. On 23 July 2017, Liporace completed a move to UAI Urquiza of Primera B Metropolitana. Thirty appearances followed. July 2018 saw Liporace join Primera B Nacional's Brown. He made his debut on 1 September in a win over Olimpo.

In September 2020, Liporace headed abroad for the first time as he agreed terms with Italian Serie C side Sambenedettese. His first appearance arrived on 23 September during a Coppa Italia first round defeat to Alessandria.

On 21 October 2021, he signed with Panachaiki in Greece.

Career statistics
.

References

External links

1992 births
Living people
People from Morón Partido
Argentine footballers
Association football defenders
Argentine expatriate footballers
Expatriate footballers in Italy
Argentine expatriate sportspeople in Italy
Expatriate footballers in Greece
Argentine expatriate sportspeople in Greece
Primera D Metropolitana players
Primera C Metropolitana players
Primera B Metropolitana players
Primera Nacional players
Serie C players
Club Atlético San Miguel footballers
Cañuelas footballers
UAI Urquiza players
Club Atlético Brown footballers
Atlético de Rafaela footballers
A.S. Sambenedettese players
Panachaiki F.C. players
Sportspeople from Buenos Aires Province